Nieun (sign: ㄴ; (Korean: 니은) is the second consonant of the Korean alphabet. The Unicode for ㄴ is U+3134. It makes an 'n' sound. The IPA pronunciation is [n].

Stroke order

Other communicative representations

References 

Hangul jamo